Martín Pérez Guedes (born 18 August 1991) is an Argentine professional footballer who plays as a left midfielder for Universitario de Deportes.

Career
Pérez Guedes' career got underway in Torneo Argentino A with Huracán in 2009. He scored four goals in his debut season, which were the first of twelve goals in eighty-three appearances over two seasons for the club. In June 2011, Pérez Guedes joined Olimpo of the Argentine Primera División. He made his professional debut with Olimpo on 10 September during a 1–0 loss to Racing Club. After five goals in twenty-one games in 2011–12 for Olimpo, Pérez Guedes signed for Racing Club ahead of the 2012–13 campaign. In July 2013, Olimpo resigned Pérez Guedes on loan.

On 8 September, Pérez Guedes scored the first two goals of his second spell in a 3–0 victory at home to Boca Juniors. In total, he scored three goals in twenty-six matches during his temporary spell with Olimpo. In the 2015 season, Pérez Guedes played for Quilmes on loan which preceded a 2016 loan with Temperley. On 28 July 2016, Pérez Guedes joined Olimpo for a third time; on loan for the second. He featured fifteen times in the 2016–17 Primera División which Olimpo ended 16th. August 2017 saw Pérez Guedes leave Racing Club on loan again, to Primera B Nacional's Mitre.

Pérez Guedes made his 100th career appearance in April 2018 against Sarmiento. Defensores de Belgrano completed the loan signing of Pérez Guedes on 16 August. After three goals in twenty-three games for them, he returned to Racing Club prior to agreeing a move to Indian Super League side Delhi Dynamos, who were later rechristened as Odisha, on 2 July 2019. He made his debut on 22 October in a 2–1 defeat to Jamshedpur, with his first goal arriving in a December victory over Hyderabad. He also scored against NorthEast United and Kerala Blasters, whilst featuring eighteen times.

In August 2020, Pérez Guedes returned to his homeland with Gimnasia y Esgrima of Primera B Nacional. He netted three times, versus ex-club Quilmes, All Boys and Instituto, across seven appearances for them. In late January 2021, Pérez Guedes agreed a move to Peruvian football with Universidad de San Martín.

Career statistics
.

References

External links

1991 births
Living people
Sportspeople from Buenos Aires Province
Argentine footballers
Association football midfielders
Argentine expatriate footballers
Expatriate footballers in India
Argentine expatriate sportspeople in India
Torneo Argentino A players
Argentine Primera División players
Primera Nacional players
Indian Super League players
Huracán de Tres Arroyos footballers
Olimpo footballers
Racing Club de Avellaneda footballers
Quilmes Atlético Club footballers
Club Atlético Temperley footballers
Club Atlético Mitre footballers
Defensores de Belgrano footballers
Odisha FC players
Gimnasia y Esgrima de Jujuy footballers
Club Deportivo Universidad de San Martín de Porres players
FBC Melgar footballers